Phyllonorycter tsavensis is a moth of the family Gracillariidae. It is found in Kenya and South Africa. The habitat consists of east African savannah.

The length of the forewings is 2.2 mm. The forewing is elongate and the ground colour is bronze ochreous with white markings. The hindwings are pale beige with a silver shine. Adults are on wing in mid-January (in South Africa) and mid-April (in Kenya).

Etymology
The name of this species is formed from the name of the type locality, Tsavo, and the Latin suffix -ensis, denoting location.

References

Moths described in 2012
tsavensis
Moths of Africa

Taxa named by Jurate de Prins
Lepidoptera of Kenya
Lepidoptera of South Africa